Arzl im Pitztal is a municipality and a town in the district of Imst in the Austrian state of Tyrol.

Geography
The stream Pitze flows through the municipality.

Population

Personalities
The professional skier Benjamin Raich and the band Mother's Cake come from the village.

References

External links

 
 Private Webseite mit weiteren Infos zur Gemeinde

Cities and towns in Imst District